Trent T. Owens (born January 4, 1975) is an American stock car racing driver and crew chief who works for Kaulig Racing as the crew chief for their No. 31 Chevrolet Camaro ZL1 1LE in the NASCAR Cup Series, driven by Justin Haley. He was previously a driver in what was then known as the NASCAR Craftsman Truck Series and the ARCA Bondo/Mar-Hyde Series. He is also the nephew of seven-time Cup Series champion Richard Petty. Owens previously crew chiefed for Petty's team as well as JTG Daugherty Racing, Braun Racing/Turner Motorsports/Turner Scott Motorsports and Bobby Gerhart Racing.

Racing career

Driving career
Owens started his career while still in high school, working for Petty Enterprises, owned by his uncle Richard. He also worked at the Richard Petty Driving Experience.

In 2000, Owens attempted to qualify for the season-finale for the ARCA Bondo/Mar-Hyde Series at Atlanta in a No. 37 car owned by crew chief Barry Dodson, but he failed to qualify. He would not attempt to make any other ARCA starts. Owens made his debut in the NASCAR Craftsman Truck Series in 2001, driving the No. 49 Ford at Pikes Peak. He started 32nd, but managed a good day, finishing 19th. He then topped that run with an 18th at Texas before finishing 34th at Kansas. He then switched rides, competing in three events for Ware Racing Enterprises. His best run was a 19th, coming in the season-finale at California.

In 2002, Owens became the driver of the No. 15 Ford for Countryman Ballew Racing. He failed to qualify for the season-opener at Daytona. In the rest of the races he ran for the team (the next six races), he scored top-20s in all but one of his starts. His best finish of the year was a 14th at Pikes Peak (where he had his best career start of 12th), but he also had a pair of 15ths at Darlington and Dover. After the race at Texas, Owens was released due to funding issues. He was without a ride for the rest of the season.

Crew chiefing career

After being unable to find another ride, in 2003, Owens took his first crew chiefing job for Scott Traylor Motorsports's No. 5 car in the ARCA Re/Max Series, working with a young Clint Bowyer as he made his series debut at Nashville Superspeedway, helping him pull off an eye-opening 2nd-place finish with Richard Childress in attendance, which led to Childress signing Bowyer to become a development driver for his team. Bowyer would go on to become a Cup Series driver for RCR.

Starting in 2006, Owens worked for Braun Racing, later Turner Motorsports and then Turner Scott Motorsports as a crew chief in the NASCAR Nationwide Series, scoring wins with Mark Martin, Dave Blaney, Reed Sorenson, James Buescher, and Nelson Piquet Jr. He was also the crew chief for Kyle Larson in 2013, and although he did not win any races that year, he won Rookie of the Year and moved up to a Cup Series ride with Chip Ganassi Racing the following year.

On December 2, 2013, it was announced that Owens would be moving up to the NASCAR Sprint Cup Series in 2014, having been hired by Richard Petty Motorsports to crew chief the team's No. 43 entry for driver Aric Almirola.

Owens was released from his contract at Richard Petty Motorsports at the end of the 2016 season. He was then hired to crew chief JTG Daugherty Racing's new second car, the No. 37, driven by Chris Buescher, in 2017.

In 2020, Buescher left for Roush Fenway Racing and he was replaced by Ryan Preece (previously the driver of JTGD's No. 47 car), and Owens remained the crew chief of the No. 37 car. Prior to the 2020 Auto Club 400 at Fontana, Owens was suspended after the car was discovered to have an illegal modification during pre-race inspection. The team was also docked 10 owner and driver points.

When the No. 37 car was closed down after the 2021 season, Owens lost his job with JTGD and moved to Kaulig Racing to crew chief their new No. 31 car in the Cup Series, driven by Justin Haley, who is the nephew of Todd Braun, the owner of Braun Racing, who Owens used to crew chief for. On February 23, 2022, Owens was suspended for four races after the No. 31 lost a wheel during the 2022 Daytona 500. On May 17, Owens was once again suspended for four races due to a tire and wheel loss during the 2022 AdventHealth 400 at Kansas.

Personal life
Owens is married and has two children. He is the nephew of Richard Petty. His father Randy Owens, the brother of Petty's late wife Lynda, was a member of Petty's pit crew at age 19 and killed during a pit road accident when a water tank caught on fire during the 1975 Winston 500. Trent was four months old at the time. His father-in-law is fellow NASCAR crew chief Barry Dodson who won the 1989 Cup championship with driver Rusty Wallace.

Motorsports career results

NASCAR
(key) (Bold – Pole position awarded by qualifying time. Italics – Pole position earned by points standings or practice time. * – Most laps led.)

Craftsman Truck Series

ARCA Bondo/Mar-Hyde Series
(key) (Bold – Pole position awarded by qualifying time. Italics – Pole position earned by points standings or practice time. * – Most laps led.)

References

External links
 
 

Living people
1975 births
People from Mecklenburg County, North Carolina
Petty family
Racing drivers from Charlotte, North Carolina
Racing drivers from North Carolina
NASCAR crew chiefs
NASCAR drivers